There are many types of street name signs in New York City. The standard format is a green sign in all-capital letters, with the suffix abbreviated and in superscript. Many signs deviate from this design, especially in historic districts and in Midtown Manhattan and the Financial District.

Manhattan and the Bronx
Street identification was historically performed on the sides of buildings. The "Guggenheimer Ordinance", passed by the Municipal Assembly in 1901, required owners of properties on street corners to label their respective streets with  letters on a blue background; this proved unpopular with such owners.

Pole-mounted street signs were installed beginning in the 1910s. In Manhattan and the Bronx, these took the form of dark blue "humpback signs" with white all-capital serifed text. The hump on the signs indicated the cross street; for example, if one were on Broadway and looking at the street sign for the intersection with 4th Street, the main portion of the sign would say "4th St." and the hump would say "Broadway". These signs continued to be used until the 1960s.

Queens
Signs in Queens were typically white with blue text in the 1960s; for the filming of Men In Black III, such signs were recreated for period correctness.

See also

Street signs in Chicago

References

External links
A 1930 view of Broadway, showcasing many "humpback" street signs then in use

Streets in New York City
Road signs in the United States